The 115th district of the Texas House of Representatives contains parts of Coppell, Irving, Grapevine, Carrollton, Farmers Branch, Dallas, and Addison. The current Representative is Julie Johnson, who has represented the district since 2019.

References 

115